The Rolls-Royce C range was a series of in-line 4, 6 and 8 cylinder diesel engines used in small railway locomotives, construction vehicles, marine and similar applications. They were manufactured by the Rolls-Royce Oil Engine Division headed by W. A. Robotham to 1963, initially at Derby and later at Shrewsbury, from the 1950s through to 1970s.

Although officially termed the C range, they were best known for the most common C6SFL six-cylinder variant. Most had an output of around 200 bhp, with 233 bhp for the final models. Most were supercharged by a Roots blower, but there were also variants with a turbocharger or naturally aspirated.

A later addition to the range was the SF65C model. This was a lower-rated version of the C range 6-cylinder engine and shared many of the advantages of the range's component rationalisation. It was available in naturally aspirated or turbocharged variants, and both industrial and marine versions were available.

Dimensions

Construction 
The engine was constructed around a monobloc cylinder and crankcase casting. Unusually, this was available in either cast iron or aluminium alloy. The cylinders were replaceable wet liners, with pumped water cooling. Valves were single OHV exhaust and inlet valves. Seven bearings with cross-bolted caps supported the nitrided crankshaft. The fuel injection system was direct, into a toroidal combustion chamber within the aluminium pistons. Supercharging was by a Roots blower driven at twice crankshaft speed, for a boost pressure of 8 psi.

An unusual feature was the ability to build the engines with the flywheel and output drive arranged at either end. The supercharger, fuel injection pump, and other auxiliaries also changed sides. Although the crankshaft always rotated the same way within the block, this was the equivalent of offering left and right-handed rotation engines (the C6SFR variant).

For a diesel at its introduction date of 1951, the engine operated at relatively high speed, up to 1,800 rpm. This was assisted by a viscous torsion damper at the opposite end to the flywheel. High rotational speed made the engine an attractive choice in the developing market for small diesel-hydraulic locomotives.

Rolls-Royce Sentinel 

In 1957, Rolls-Royce acquired the Sentinel company of Shrewsbury, a builder of steam wagons and small steam locomotives. Production of the C6 was relocated from Derby. Although Rolls-Royce had only intended to build prime movers, i.e. engines here, by the end of 1957 they had decided to continue with Sentinel's previously successful market for small shunting locomotives. This was initially the LB class, 0-4-0 with a typically Sentinel final chain drive, of 1959-1971.

In the 1980s, the Shrewsbury diesel engine plant was acquired by Perkins Engines.

Variants 

C6SFL (supercharged by Roots blower), C6TFL (turbocharged), C6NFL (naturally aspirated), C6NFR (reverse rotation)

 
The C8SFL was a lengthened 8-cylinder variant, giving approximately 300 bhp. This was fitted to the MK3  Thornycroft Antar a British tank transporter

A C6SFLM (marinised) was also produced.

Horizontal railcar engines 

 
Horizontal versions, such as the C6NFLH (H for horizontal), were also produced for railcars and mounted beneath the floor. This engine was not completely horizontal, with the cylinders inclined slightly upwards at 17½°. Wet sump lubrication was used. Many of the ancillaries and servicing points were relocated to what were now the sides of the engine, so that they could be serviced from the sides of the railcar, rather than having to lift out floor panels.

The C6NFLH produced 180 bhp at 1,800 rpm. It was used by Metropolitan-Cammell in the Class 111 DMUs of the late 1950s and 1960s, rather than the 150 bhp BUT engines used in earlier classes. Two engines were used for each power car, marshalled into two or three car sets with a power car at each end, giving 720 bhp overall. This extra power was also used for the Birmingham Railway Carriage & Wagon Company built 'Calder Valley' sets.

An eight-cylinder version, C8NFLH, of 238 bhp at 1,880 rpm was also used. A single unit was used in each power car of the 112 and 113 classes. These were very similar, the 112 having a mechanical pre-selector transmission and the 113 a Lysholm-Smith Twin-Disc torque converter (licence-built by Rolls-Royce) in a hydraulic transmission. The high density 125 and 127 classes used twin engines.

The C8NFLH, governed to 180 bhp at 1,500 rpm, was also used as the pair of auxiliary generators powering the air-conditioning, lighting and galley of the Blue Pullman sets.

Twin supercharged C8SFLH engines of 250 hp were used in some of the early New South Wales 620 Class railcars with licence built Twin Disc transmissions. C8SFLH engines and licence built Twin Disc transmissions were also used to re-engine a number of Canadian National and Canadian Pacific's Budd railcars.

Supercharged C6SFLH units of 230 bhp were trialled in a single British Rail Class 111 and were later retrofitted to the Norwegian Class 86 and 91 DMUs. The three South Maitland Railway railcar of 1961 also used Supercharged C6SFLH units of 233 hp with a licence built Twin Disc transmission.

Applications

Railway  
The major railway uses of this engine were the horizontal versions used in many of the British Rail first generation DMUs. Norwegian State Railways also retrofitted them to their Class 86 and 91 multiple units.

Vertical engines were also used in a range of small shunting locomotives, sometimes in pairs for powers up to 600 bhp..
 Rolls-Royce Sentinel
 Several diesel-electric and diesel-hydraulic locomotives manufactured by the Yorkshire Engine Company:
 170 hp 0-4-0 diesel-hydraulic (also British Rail Class 02) – one C6NFL
 200/220 hp 0-4-0 diesel-hydraulic – one C6SFL
 200/220 hp 0-4-0 and 0-6-0 diesel-electric – one C6SFL
 300 hp 0-4-0 and 0-6-0 diesel-electric – one C8SFL
 300 hp 0-6-0 diesel-hydraulic – one C8SFL
 400/440 hp 0-6-0 diesel-electric “Janus” – two C6SFL/C6TFL
 600 hp Bo-Bo diesel-electric "Olympus" – two C8SFL
 600 hp 0-8-0 diesel-hydraulic "Taurus" and "Indus" – two C8SFL
 Midland Railway of Western Australia E class, built by Commonwealth Engineering
 New Zealand Railways DSC class
 BHP Newcastle 37 class diesel-electric - two C6TFL built by A Goninan & Co, Broadmeadow
 Norwegian State Railways  (1963–1973)

Marine  
The marine variants of these engines were available in each of the 4, 6 and 8 cylinder models. These marine models were all of the vertical arrangement. Marine gearing options included M.R.F.10 3B, M.R.F.16B, M.R.F.16B/1B and M.R.F.21/B units from Self-Changing Gears Ltd, of Coventry and Thornycroft Type B units from Transport Equipment (Thornycroft) Ltd. of Reading.

 Thornycroft 43 ft Range Safety Launch
 A pair of C6SFLM (marinised) were used for a speed of 20 knots.

Construction vehicles 
 Vickers-Armstrongs VR180 'Vigor' crawler tractor
 Thornycroft Antar Mk3 heavy tractor unit and tank transporter.
 FV180 Combat Engineer Tractor C6TFR
 International Harvester BTD20 Bulldozer
 Sisu K-50SS ballast tractor

Fire appliances 
 Dennis F101 pumping appliances, especially for use by London Fire Brigade from 1956 onwards.

See also 
 Rolls-Royce B range engines

Further reading

References 

C range
Diesel locomotive engines
Diesel engines by model
Straight-four engines
Straight-six engines
Straight-eight engines